Ramesses VI Nebmaatre-Meryamun (sometimes written Ramses or Rameses, also known under his princely name of Amenherkhepshef C) was the fifth ruler of the Twentieth Dynasty of Egypt. He reigned for about eight years in the mid-to-late 12th century BC and was a son of Ramesses III and queen Iset Ta-Hemdjert. As a prince, he was known as Ramesses Amunherkhepeshef and held the titles of royal scribe and cavalry general. He was succeeded by his son, Ramesses VII Itamun, whom he had fathered with queen Nubkhesbed.

After the death of the ruling pharaoh, Ramesses V, who was the son of Ramesses VI's older brother, Ramesses IV, Ramesses VI ascended the throne. In the first two years after his coronation, Ramesses VI stopped frequent raids by Libyan or Egyptian marauders in Upper Egypt and buried his predecessor in what is now an unknown tomb of the Theban necropolis. Ramesses VI usurped KV9, a tomb in the Valley of the Kings planned by and for Ramesses V, and had it enlarged and redecorated for himself. The craftsmen's huts near the entrance of KV9 covered up the entrance to Tutankhamun's tomb, saving it from a wave of tomb robberies that occurred within 20 years of Ramesses VI's death. Ramesses VI may have planned and made six more tombs in the Valley of the Queens, none which are known today.

Egypt lost control of its last strongholds in Canaan around the time of Ramesses VI's reign. Though Egyptian occupation in Nubia continued, the loss of the Asiatic territories strained Egypt's weakening economy and increased prices. With construction projects increasingly hard to fund, Ramesses VI usurped the monuments of his forefathers by engraving his cartouches over theirs. Yet he boasted of having  "[covered] all the land with great monuments in my name [...] built in honour of my fathers the gods". He was fond of cult statues of himself; more are known to portray him than any Twentieth-Dynasty king after Ramesses III. The Egyptologist Amin Amer characterises Ramesses VI as "a king who wished to pose as a great pharaoh in an age of unrest and decline".

The pharaoh's power waned in Upper Egypt during Ramesses VI's rule. Though his daughter Iset was named God's Wife of Amun, the high-priest of Amun, Ramessesnakht, turned Thebes into Egypt's religious capital and a second center of power on par with Pi-Ramesses in Lower Egypt, where the pharaoh resided. In spite of these developments, there is no evidence that Ramessesnakht's dynasty worked against royal interests, which suggests that the Ramesside kings may have approved of these evolutions.
Ramesses VI died in his forties, in his eighth or ninth year of rule. His mummy lay untouched in his tomb for fewer than 20 years before pillagers damaged it. The body was moved to KV35 during the reign of Pinedjem I, and was discovered in 1898 by Victor Loret.

Family

Parents and early life
Ramesses VI was a son of Ramesses III, the latter being considered the last great pharaoh of the New Kingdom period. This filiation is established beyond doubt by a large relief found in the portico of the Medinet Habu temple of Ramesses III known as the "Procession of the Princes". The relief shows ten princes including Ramesses VI, worshipping their father. Ramesses III's sculptors seem to have left the relief incomplete; only the figures of the king and princes appear and no names are written in the spaces next to them. The relief seems to have originally been executed when Ramesses VI was still a young prince, as he is shown wearing the sidelock of youth used to denote childhood.
When Ramesses VI became king, he added his princely names "Ramesses Amunherkhepeshef" inside royal cartouches as well as the titles he held before ascending the throne as "king's son of his body, his beloved, crown prince, royal scribe [and] cavalry general". He altered his youthful figure on the "Procession of the Princes" with an uraeus underscoring his royal status and further completed the relief with the names of all his brothers and sons, with the exception of Ramesses IV, who had already written his royal name on the relief.

Speculation in Egyptology during the 1960s and 1970s concerning the chronology and genealogy of the Twentieth Dynasty as well as uncertainties affecting the identity of the king shown on the "Procession of princes" relief led some scholars to propose  that Ramesses VI was a grandson of Ramesses III and the son either of an unknown prince or of the infamous Pentawer involved in the murder of Ramesses III. Such hypotheses have now been conclusively rejected and the relief is understood to mean exactly what it shows: that Ramesses VI was the son of Ramesses III. Ramesses VI's mother was probably Iset Ta-Hemdjert, Ramesses III's Great Royal Wife, as suggested by the presence of Ramesses VI's cartouches on a door-jamb of her tomb in the Valley of the Queens.

Consort and children

Ramesses VI's Great Royal Wife was queen Nubkhesbed. The Egyptologists Aidan Dodson and Dyan Hilton believe that she bore Ramesses VI a total of four children: the princes Amenherkhepshef, Panebenkemyt and Ramesses Itamun—the future pharaoh Ramesses VII who succeeded his father for a short while on the throne—and princess Iset who was appointed to the priestly role of "Divine Adoratrice of Amun". A stela recounting this appointment was discovered in Koptos and demonstrates that Nubkhesbed was indeed Iset's mother.

Prince Amenherkhepshef died before his father and was buried in tomb KV13 in the Valley of the Kings, originally built for Chancellor Bay, an important official of the late Nineteenth Dynasty. The tomb decoration was updated in consequence, some reliefs notably mentioning Nubkhesbed. Amenherkhepshef's sarcophagus was usurped from queen Twosret.

The filiation of Ramesses VII is established by an inscription on a doorjamb from Deir el-Medinaeh which reads "the good god, lord of the two lands, Usimaare-meryamun-setepenre, Son of Re, lord of epiphanies, Ramesses [VII], (It)-Amun, god, ruler of Heliopolis—he has made as his monument for his father, (may) live the good god, lord of the two lands, Nebmaare-meryamun, Son of Re, [Ramesses VI]".

The Egyptologists James Harris, Edward F. Wente and Kenneth Kitchen have also proposed, based on circumstantial evidence, that Ramesses IX was a son of Ramesses VI and thus a brother to Ramesses VII. They note that Ramesses IX honoured Ramesses VII on two offering stands, suggesting that they were close kin. Ramesses IX named one of his sons Nebmaatre, which is Ramesses VI's prenomen, possibly as a means to honour his father. This hypothesis is contested by other scholars including Dodson and Hilton, who believe that Ramesses IX was instead a son of prince Montuherkhopshef and thus a nephew to Ramesses VI. They base their conclusion on other circumstantial evidence: first is a depiction of Montuherkhopshef in KV19 on which Ramesses IX's prenomen had been added. Second is the fact that Ramesses IX's mother was named Takhat and Montuherkhopshef's spouse might have been a lady of the same name, hence possibly the same person.

Reign

Reign length
The scholarly consensus is now that Ramesses VI reigned in the mid 12th century BC over a period of eight full years and lived for two months into his brief last regnal year. More precisely, the Egyptologist Steve Vinson proposed that he reigned between 1156 BC and 1149 BC, while the Encyclopædia Britannica reports 1145–1137 BC, Jürgen von Beckerath gives 1142–1134 BC, Erik Hornung 1145–1139 BC, Nicolas Grimal 1144–1136 BC making him a contemporary of Nebuchadrezzar I of Isin, Ian Shaw, Jacobus van Dijk and Michael Rice 1143–1136 BC, and 1132–1125 BC in a 2017 study.

In 1977, the Egyptologists Wente and Charles van Siclen were the first to propose, upon reviewing the chronology of the New Kingdom period, that Ramesses VI lived into his eighth year of reign. This hypothesis was vindicated the next year by the Egyptologist Jac Janssen, who published an analysis of an ostracon which mentions the loan of an ox in the seventh and eighth years of an unnamed king who can only have been Ramesses VI. Two years later, Lanny Bell reported further evidence that Ramesses VI not only reigned into his eighth regnal year but most likely completed it and lived into his ninth.
Ramesses VI's eighth year on the throne may also be mentioned in Theban graffito 1860a, which names the then serving High Priest of Amun, Ramessesnakht. This graffito has also been ascribed to Ramesses X, but this interpretation has been contested and its ascription to Ramesses VI has been proposed as an alternative. The subject remains debated.
An important piece of evidence first recognised by Jansen in 1978 but fully exploited only five years later by the Egyptologist Raphael Ventura is found on the Turin Papyrus 1907+1908, which covers the time period from Ramesses VI's fifth year until Ramesses VII's seventh year on the throne.
The reconstruction of the document proposed by Ventura shows that the simplest solution available to explain the chronology of the period covered by the papyrus is that Ramesses VI enjoyed a reign of eight full years, died in his ninth, and was succeeded by Ramesses VII rather than Ramesses VIII, as had been debated until then.

Activities and situation in Egypt

Early reign: strife in the Theban region

Immediately after his accession to the throne, Ramesses VI and his court may have visited Thebes on the occasion of the Beautiful Festival of the Valley or the Opet Festival, concomitant with the preparations for Ramesses V's burial. Ramesses VI visited the city on at least another occasion during his reign, when he installed his daughter as Divine Adoratrice of Amun. The situation in the south of Egypt at the time of Ramesses VI's accession was not entirely stable, as attested by records showing that the workmen of Deir el-Bahari could not work on the king's tomb owing to the presence of "the enemy" in the vicinity, a situation which occurred over a period of at least fifteen days during Ramesses VI's first year on the throne. This "enemy" was rumoured to have pillaged and burned the locality  of Per-Nebyt and the chief of the Medjay of Thebes—essentially the police—ordered the workmen to remain idle and watch the king's tomb. It is unclear who these enemies were, the term could designate parties of Libyan Meshwesh, Libu and Egyptian bandits, or as the Egyptologist Jaroslav Černý conjectured, a full blown civil war between followers of Ramesses V and Ramesses VI, a hypothesis supported by Rice but which has been strongly rejected by Kitchen and, to a lesser extend, by Grimal and van Dijk.
A short military campaign might have ensued and from Ramesses VI's second year on the throne onwards these troubles seem to have stopped. This campaign could be connected with an unusual statue of Ramesses VI showing him holding a bound Libyan captive, as well as with a depiction of Ramesses VI triumphing over foreign soldiers on the second pylon of the Karnak temple. This triumph scene was the last one to be made in Egypt until the later reigns of Siamun (986–967 BC) and Shoshenq I (943–922 BC).

Other indications in favour of strife and military activities early in Ramesses VI's reign are the names he adopted upon ascending the throne, his Horus name meaning "Strong bull, great of victories, keeping alive the two lands" as well as his Nebty name "Powerful of arms, attacking the myriads".

Later reign
Following these events, on his second year of rule, Ramesses VI finally buried Ramesses V in a yet unidentified tomb in the Valley of the Kings, having usurped the tomb originally prepared for his predecessor. On the occasion of this visit to Thebes, Ramesses VI installed his daughter Iset as God's Wife of Amun and Divine Adoratice of Amun, in the presence of his mother, the acting vizier Nehy and other court officials. That same year, he ordered the reduction of the gang of workmen working on the king's tomb from 120 members to its former number of 60, which had been changed under Ramesses IV. Following this, the community of workers at Deir el-Medina went into gradual decline, the settlement being finally abandoned in the subsequent Twenty-first Dynasty.
In spite of the reduction, the Turin papyrus indicates that Ramesses VI ordered the construction of six tombs in the Valley of the Queens, a number which might include the hasty completion of the tomb of Iset Ta-Hemdjert, Ramesses' mother.
It is unknown whether these tombs were finished and in any case, they are now unidentifiable.

At some point in his reign, a cult statue of Ramesses VI was installed in a shrine of Ramesses II in the temple of Hathor of Deir el-Medina. The statue was called "Lord of the Two Lands, Nebmaatre Meryamun, Son of Re, Lord of Crowns, Ramesses Amunherkhepeshef Divine Ruler of Iunu, Beloved like Amun".
A complete description of it is given on the verso of the Turin Papyrus Map, celebrated for being the oldest surviving topographical map. The papyrus indicates that the statue was made of two essences of painted wood and clay, showing pharaoh wearing a golden loincloth, a crown of lapis-lazuli and precious stones, a uraeus of gold and sandals of electrum. The statue is said to receive three services of incense and libations every day. The text of the papyrus is a letter directly addressed to Ramesses VI asking that a certain man be put in charge of the offerings. The letter seems to have been received favourably by the king, as the author's grandson is known to have held the title of "High Priest of Nebmaatre [Ramesses VI], Beloved of Amun".

Ramesses VI was apparently fond of such cult statues and no less than ten statues and a sphinx have been discovered in Tanis, Bubastis and Karnak, more than any other Ramesside king of the Twentieth Dynasty following the reign of Ramesses III. The tomb of Penne, an Egyptian high-official in Nubia reports that Penne made a donation of lands to generate revenue towards the upkeep of yet another cult statue of Ramesses VI. Ramesses VI was so satisfied with this deed that he commanded his Viceroy of Kush "Give the two silver vessels of ointment of gums, to the deputy [Penne]".

While few of Ramesses VI's activities are known in details, he is well attested by numerous reliefs, inscriptions, statues and minor finds from Karnak, Koptos and Heliopolis.

Economic decline
Over the period spanning the reigns of Ramesses VI, VII and VIII, prices of basic commodities, in particular grain, rose sharply.
With Egypt's economy getting weaker, Ramesses VI turned to usurping the statues and monuments of his forebears, frequently plastering and then carving his cartouches over theirs, in particular those of Ramesses IV which figured prominently along the processional routes in Karnak and Luxor. In other examples, he usurped a statue of Ramesses IV, columns of texts inscribed by Ramesses IV on an obelisk of Thutmose I in Karnak, and the tomb of Ramesses V. Kitchen warns not to over-interpret these usurpations as signs of antagonism on behalf of Ramesses VI with respect to his older brother and nephew. The usurpations were not thorough but were rather targeted to the most prominent places, where Ramesses VI's cartouches would be most visible. Besides, Ramesses VI did leave cartouches of Ramesses IV intact in many places, including in places where both his name and that of his brother feature close to one another such as in the Medinet Habu temple of Ramesses III, so that the hypothesis of a damnatio memoriae—whereby all references to someone are systematically eliminated so as to remove this person from memory and history—can be eliminated.

A possible evidence for genuine architectural works on Ramesses VI's behalf is found in Memphis, where an inscription on a granite gateway cornice of the temple of Ptah claims that he erected a great pylon of fine stone. Ramesses VI then boasts of "covering all the land with great monuments in my name [...] built in honour of my fathers the gods".
Overall, the Egyptologist Amin Amer characterises Ramesses VI as "a king who wished to pose as a great pharaoh in an age of unrest and decline".

Dilution of power

High officials
Some high officials of Ramesses VI are known, such as his finance minister and overseer of the treasury Montuemtawy who was in office since the end of Ramesses III's reign; the vizier Neferronpe in office since Ramesses IV's time on the throne; his son the vizier Nehy; Amenmose the mayor of Thebes and the king's butler Qedren. To the south, the troop commander of Kush was Nebmarenakhte and  the administrator of Wawat—the land between the first and second cataracts of the Nile—mayor of Anîba and controller of the Temple of Horus at Derr was Penne.

The dynasty of Ramessesnakht

In Thebes, the high-priesthood came under the control of Ramessesnakht and his family at the time of Ramesses IV, possibly owing to Ramessesnakht's father Merybaste's high control over the country's financial institutions. Ramessesnakht was officially Ramesses VI's Vizier of the South and his power grew at the expense of that of the pharaoh in spite of the fact that Iset was connected to the Amun priesthood as well "in her role as God's Wife of Amun or Divine Adoratice". If fact, Ramessesnakht most likely oversaw the construction of the funerary building of Iset in the tomb
complex K93.12, and while, as the Egyptologist Daniel Polz puts it, "he and his relatives were the most powerful individuals in Egypt at the end of the Twentieth Dynasty", his activities were not directed against royal interests. Ramessesnakht often attended the distribution of supplies to workmen and controlled much of the activity connected with the construction of the king's tomb, possibly because the treasury of the high-priest of Amun was now at least partially funding these works. Ramessesnakht's son Usermarenakhte was made into the Steward of Amun and became administrator of large swaths of land in Middle Egypt. He also inherited the role of Merybaste as controller of the country's taxes, ensuring that Ramessesnakht's family was in full control of both the royal treasury and the treasury of Amun. Further high offices such as those of the second and third priests and of "god's father of Amun" were given to people who entered Ramesesnakht's family by marriage.

Ramessesnakht was powerful enough to build for himself one of the largest funerary establishments of the entire Theban necropolis at the end of the New Kingdom, when royal building projects including Ramesses VI's usurped mortuary temple had been abandoned. Ramessesnakht's monument, in Dra' Abu el-Naga', reused an earlier building dating back to the Seventeenth or Eighteenth Dynasty and was refurbished to show the political and economic standing of its owner. Overall, Egyptologists now estimate that Ramessesnakht and his dynasty essentially established a second centre of power in Upper Egypt, seemingly on the behalf of the Twentieth Dynasty kings who ruled from Memphis and Pi-Ramesses in Lower Egypt. This effectively made Thebes into the religious capital of Egypt as well as an administrative one on a par with its northern counterpart, laying the foundations for the rise of the Twenty-first Dynasty under Herihor and Pinedjem I, 50 to 70 years later.

Situation in Egypt's empire abroad

Final decline in Canaan

Egypt's political and economic decline continued unabated during Ramesses VI's reign. He is the last king of the New Kingdom period whose name is attested on inscribed wall fragments as well as two pillars of the temple of Hathor of the Serabit el-Khadim in Sinai, where he sent expeditions to mine copper ore.

Egypt may nonetheless still have wielded some sort of influence or at least still had some connections with the remnants of its empire in the Levant, as suggested by the base of a fragmented bronze statue of Ramesses VI discovered in Megiddo in Canaan, and a scarab of his from Alalakh on the coast in southern Anatolia.

Egyptian presence in Canaan was terminated during or soon after Ramesses VI's rule, with the last garrisons leaving southern and western Palestine around the time, and the frontier between Egypt and abroad returning to a fortified line joining the Mediterranean to the Red Sea. A 2017 archaeological study  reached the same conclusion, namely that Ramesses VI's reign is the terminus post quem for the presence of the Egyptian military in Jaffa, which was twice destroyed around this time period. Opponents of the Egyptian authority were of local extraction, probably originating in Canaanite cities of the Levantine coastal plain, an opposition to Egyptian hegemony ultimately resulting from the arrival of the Sea People in the region during the reign of Ramesses III. The loss of all Asiatic territories further strained the redistributive economy of Egypt's New Kingdom society, depriving the subsequent kings of much of their legitimacy.

Continuing presence in Nubia
The Egyptian control of Nubia seems to have been much firmer at the time, owing either to the advanced Egyptianisation of the local population or to the economic importance of this region. Ramesses VI's cartouches have been uncovered on Sehel Island near Aswan and in Ramesses II's temple in Wadi es-Sebua. Ramesses VI is mentioned in the tomb of Penne in Anîba, not far from the Third Cataract of the Nile. Penne also recounts punitive military raids further south, from which he claims to have brought back loot to pharaoh.

Funerary monuments

Tomb

Ramesses VI was buried in the Valley of the Kings, in a tomb now known as KV9. The tomb was first built for Ramesses V, who may have been buried in it for the short period of time necessary for another, likely undecorated tomb, to be cut for him somewhere else in the Valley of Kings and which remains to be discovered. In any case, Ramesses VI commanded that KV9 be entirely refurbished for himself with no space left for Ramesses V's permanent burial, who was finally led to rest in Ramesses VI's second year on the throne, possibly because stability had returned to Thebes at the time. The usurpation of Ramesses V's tomb may be a sign that Ramesses VI did not hold his predecessor in high regard, which would explain why he had Ramesses V's name obliterated and replaced by his own on more than one occasion. Alternatively it may reflect the king's pragmatic concern for economical measures.

The renewed works on KV9 are responsible for the preservation of the tomb of Tutankhamun, the entrance of which was buried beneath huts built for the craftsmen working on Ramesses VI's tomb. These works seem to have been completed during Ramesses VI's sixth year of reign, at which point Ramessesnakht received 600 debens of blunted copper tools in the great forecourt of Amun in Karnak, probably indicating the end of the construction works on the tomb. Furthermore, if the Theban ostracon 1860a does refer to Ramesses VI and not Ramesses X, then it indicates that the tomb was finally ready for the king in his eighth year on the throne, at which point he might have been ill and nearing death. Once finished, the tomb was -long and included one of only three complete renditions of the Book of Gates known from royal funerary context, as well as a complete version of the Book of Caverns.

Within 20 years of Ramesses VI's burial, the tomb was most probably desecrated and ransacked by grave robbers, who hacked away at the hands and feet of Ramesses' mummy to gain access to his jewelry. These events, occurring during the reign of Ramesses XI, are described in the Papyrus Mayer B although the identification of the tomb mentioned in this source is not entirely certain. Ramesses VI's mummy was subsequently moved to the tomb KV35 of Amenhotep II during the reign of Pinedjem of the early Twenty-First Dynasty, where it was discovered in 1898 by Victor Loret.
A medical examination of the mummy revealed that Ramesses VI died aged around forty, and showed severe damage to his body, the head and torso being broken into several pieces by an axe used by the tomb robbers.

In 1898, Georges Émile Jules Daressy cleared KV9, which had remained opened since antiquity, uncovering fragments of a large granite box as well as numerous pieces of Ramesses VI's mummiform stone sarcophagus, the face of which is now in the British Museum. The sarcophagus was restored in 2004 following two years of work on over 250 fragments recovered in the tomb, where it is now on display. Zahi Hawass, then head of Egypt's Supreme Council of Antiquities, unsuccessfully requested the return of the sarcophagus' face from the British Museum to Egypt.

In 2020, the Egyptian Tourism Authority released a full 3D model of the tomb with detailed photographies, available online.

In April 2021 his mummy was moved from the Egyptian Museum to the National Museum of Egyptian Civilization along with those of 17 other kings and 4 queens in an event termed the Pharaohs' Golden Parade.

Mortuary temple
Ramesses VI seems to have usurped the large mortuary temple in El-Assasif from Ramesses V, who had himself likely taken it from his father Ramesses IV. The temple was planned to be nearly half the size of that of Medinet Habu and was only in its foundation stages at the death of Ramesses IV. It is unclear whether it was ever completed, but the temple is mentioned as a land-owning institution in the Wilbour Papyrus dating to Ramesses V's reign. Archaeological excavations show much of its surviving decoration was made under Ramesses VI.

Notes and references

Notes

References

Sources

.

External links 
 Ramesses VI Nebmaatre-meryamun on Digital Egypt
 Virtual tour of his tomb
 Virtual exploration of his tomb 

 
12th-century BC Pharaohs
Pharaohs of the Twentieth Dynasty of Egypt
Ancient Egyptian mummies
Year of birth unknown
Ramesses III